B. sylvestris may refer to:

 Bellis sylvestris, the southern daisy, a plant species
 Bombus sylvestris, a bumblebee species
 Breviceps sylvestris, the forest rain frog, a frog species endemic to South Africa

See also
 Sylvestris (disambiguation)